Riverview is an unincorporated community in Fairbanks Township, Sullivan County, in the U.S. state of Indiana, near the border with Illinois.

The community is part of the Terre Haute Metropolitan Statistical Area.

Geography 

Climate
The climate in this area is characterized by hot, humid summers and generally mild to cool winters.  According to the Köppen Climate Classification system, Riverview has a humid subtropical climate, abbreviated "Cfa" on climate maps.

References 

Unincorporated communities in Sullivan County, Indiana
Unincorporated communities in Indiana
Terre Haute metropolitan area